The Po Toi Islands are a small group of islands with a population of around 200, south-east of Hong Kong Island, off Stanley, in Hong Kong. The main island of the group is Po Toi Island. Administratively, they are part of Islands District.

The islands are notable for interesting rock formations and open-air seafood restaurants. Po Toi Island has a "haunted house", and some rock carvings supposed to be the epitaph of an emperor who died on or near Po Toi. Waglan Island has one of the five surviving pre-war lighthouses in Hong Kong.

Geography

Po Toi Islands include:
 Lo Chau Pak Pai
 Beaufort Island
 Mat Chau, an islet off Po Toi island
 Mat Chau Pai, an islet off Mat Chau
 Po Toi, 3.69 km2
 Sai Pai
 San Pai
 Sung Kong
 Tai Pai
 Waglan Island

Name
For the origin of the name, see Po Toi.

Transport
The islands are accessible by private ferry (kai-to) or water taxi. Scheduled ferries connect Po Toi island with Aberdeen and Stanley.

See also

 List of islands and peninsulas of Hong Kong
 List of places in Hong Kong

References

External links

 More details and pictures 
Satellite image of Po Toi Islands by Google Maps

 
Islands District
Islands of Hong Kong
Uninhabited islands of Hong Kong